Current is an American trade journal that covers public broadcasting in the United States.  It is described by the Public Broadcasting Service (PBS) as "The most widely read periodical in the field".  It is published by Current LLC. The newspaper, founded in 1980, was one of the last creations of the National Association of Educational Broadcasters, an association of noncommercial broadcasters dating back to 1925, whose members were leaders in founding PBS and National Public Radio. After the bankrupted NAEB closed in 1981, Current resumed publication in 1982 as an independent journalistic service of the public television station WNET. WNET.org sold Current to American University School of Communication in 2010.

See also 
 Charles Frankel

References

External links
 

Professional and trade magazines
Publications established in 1980
Takoma Park, Maryland